The conditionality principle is a Fisherian principle of statistical inference that Allan Birnbaum formally defined and studied in his 1962 JASA article. Informally, the conditionality principle can be taken as the claim that experiments which were not actually performed are statistically irrelevant.

Together with the sufficiency principle, Birnbaum's version of the principle implies the famous likelihood principle. Although the relevance of the proof to data analysis remains controversial among statisticians, many Bayesians and likelihoodists consider the likelihood principle foundational for statistical inference.

Formulation
The conditionality principle makes an assertion about an experiment E that can be described as a mixture of several component experiments Eh where h is an ancillary statistic (i.e. a statistic whose probability distribution does not depend on unknown parameter values). This means that observing a specific outcome x of experiment E is equivalent to observing the value of h and taking an observation xh from the component experiment Eh, for example, rolling a dice (whose value is h = 1 ... 6) to determine which of six experiments to conduct (experiment E ... E).

The conditionality principle can be formally stated thus:
Conditionality Principle: If E is any experiment having the form of a mixture of component experiments Eh, then for each outcome  of E, the evidential meaning of any outcome x of any mixture experiment E is the same as that of the corresponding outcome xh of the corresponding component experiment Eh actually conducted, ignoring the overall structure of the mixed experiment (see ).

References

 
 
  (With discussion.)

Further reading
 

Statistical principles